The hornero birds are members of the genus Furnarius in the family  Furnariidae, native to South America.

Horneros are brown birds with rather short tails and fairly long bills. They are known for building mud nests that resemble old wood-fired ovens (the Spanish word "hornero" comes from horno, meaning "oven"). These nests have a unique chambered construction. While many Furnariids have different nests, the hornero nest is the reason for the common name applied to the entire family; ovenbirds (though unrelated to the ovenbird, which is a parulid warbler). The size and exact shape of the hornero nest varies depending on the species. They generally lay two to four eggs, although the breeding behavior of the bay hornero is virtually unknown.

Adult horneros can frequently be seen sitting on top of their nest. Except for  the uncommon and relatively shy bay hornero, horneros are typically fairly common and highly conspicuous birds. They are generally noisy. All horneros are partially terrestrial, and commonly seen walking on the ground with a relatively upright posture.

The rufous hornero is a national emblem of Argentina and Uruguay, two of the several countries it inhabits.

Taxonomy
The genus Furnarius was introduced in 1816 by the French ornithologist Louis Jean Pierre Vieillot to accommodate a single species, the rufous hornero, which therefore becomes the type species. The genus name is from Latin furnarius meaning "baker" (from furnus meaning "oven").

The genus contains eight species:

 Band-tailed hornero (Furnarius figulus)
 Pale-legged hornero (Furnarius leucopus)
 Pacific hornero (Furnarius cinnamomeus) – split from F. leucopus
 Caribbean hornero (Furnarius longirostris) – split from F. leucopus
 Bay (or pale-billed) hornero (Furnarius torridus)
 Lesser hornero (Furnarius minor)
 Rufous hornero (Furnarius rufus)
 Crested hornero (Furnarius cristatus)

Image gallery

References

Birds described in 1816

Taxa named by Louis Jean Pierre Vieillot